The following is the standings of the 2006–07 Iran 2nd Division football season.

League standings

Group 1

Group 2

References

League 2 (Iran) seasons
3